Ishwar Das Jalan was an Indian politician belonging to the Indian National Congress who was a legislator of the West Bengal Legislative Assembly from Bara Bazar constituency. He served as Speaker of the West Bengal Legislative Assembly from 21 November 1947 to 19 June 1952.

References

Members of the West Bengal Legislative Assembly
Speakers of the West Bengal Legislative Assembly